Deathwatch is a 1965 American independent drama film directed by Vic Morrow. It is an adaptation of the 1949 French play Haute Surveillance by Jean Genet.

Plot
Greeneyes and Snowball are both murderers in prison awaiting their death sentences to be carried out by guillotine. The jewel thief Lefranc and hoodlum Maurice, Greeneyes' cellmates, are imprisoned for less serious crimes, but must align themselves with tougher inmates for their own survival in prison. They both seek to get closer to Greeneyes, leading to conflict between them.

Greeneyes is illiterate; he relies on Lefranc to read aloud letters from his wife. Lefranc also writes replies to her. Once his wife learns that Greeneyes wasn't the one writing to her, she loses interest in him. Greeneyes goes into a rage. He wants her dead, and he wants either of his cellmates to kill her once they're out of prison.

Greeneyes later breaks down. He laments that he's trapped in a "prison" of his own thoughts and actions, unable to change the course of his life or turn himself around. He's taken away for a visit with his wife. While Greeneyes is gone, Maurice and Lefranc get into a fight over which is the better criminal. Each thinks that he deserves Greeneyes' favoritism.

Once Greeneyes returns, he no longer wants his wife dead. Instead, he gives her away to a guard. The guard is friendly with Greeneyes, giving him contraband from Snowball, another powerful inmate. Lefranc becomes disillusioned with Greeneyes and with Snowball, realizing that they both work with the guards. However, he still wants Greeneyes' respect and power.

Maurice and Lefranc get into a fight; Lefranc's shirt rips, revealing a tattoo. He thinks he's gained Greeneyes' favoritism, but Maurice exposes the tattoo as a painted-on fake. Maurice starts to taunt Lefranc.

Lefranc attacks Maurice and strangles him to death. He expects Greeneyes to praise him for the murder. Instead, Greeneyes is disgusted and alerts the guards. Lefranc is left with the realization that he'll never be the kind of man Greeneyes is.

Cast
Leonard Nimoy – Lefranc
Michael Forest – Greeneyes
Paul Mazursky – Maurice
Robert Ellenstein – Guard
Gavin MacLeod – Emil

Production
Vic Morrow had played Lefranc in the first New York production of Deathwatch in 1958. The three actors Leonard Nimoy, Paul Mazursky, and Michael Forest had already staged a version of the play in 1959.

Vic Morrow announced he wanted to make the film back in December 1960. He said his dream cast would include Cornel Wilde, Dan Duryea and George Hamilton.

The New York Times printed that Vic Morrow and Leonard Nimoy had acquired the movie rights to the play in the issue published November 27, 1962. Leonard Nimoy obtained the rights to film Haute Surveillance directly from Genet, though Genet had no further involvement with the project.

The screenplay was adapted by Morrow and his then-wife Barbara Turner. Part of Deathwatch was shot in the nineteenth-century Nevada State Prison, where the actors lived for six months to prepare for their roles. Some of the inmates took part in the production.

Release
The film was first shown at the San Francisco International Film Festival in 1965 but it was not given a general release nor was it widely reviewed. It was later given a limited release in the US in March 1966. One of the first films to be directly marketed to a gay audience, Deathwatch was quickly buried in the States and never released in the UK.

Reception
In a review years later, a reviewer for the San Francisco Bay Guardian wrote that in "the feature, adapted from a Genet play, which has been unjustly forgotten for 23 years, Vic Morrow's direction captures a consistent, if not very interesting, mood, and the editing seems ahead of its time in the way flashbacks are inserted. Leonard Nimoy and Michael Forest are the butch guys sharing a cell with nellie Paul Mazursky in this unromantic triangle that's hard to tear your eyes away from, even if it's not very good."

References

External links

1965 films
1965 directorial debut films
1965 drama films
1965 independent films
1960s English-language films
American drama films
American independent films
American films based on plays
Films set in prison
Films shot in Nevada
Films directed by Vic Morrow
1960s American films